Friends is a 4-episode South Korean-Japanese short drama that aired in 2002. It was produced by TBS (Japan), and MBC (South Korea). This was the first time in drama history that the two countries collaborated to co-produce the show in both South Korea and Japan. It was originally broadcast on February 4–5 in Japan and February 15–16 in South Korea.

Plot
Tomoko, a Japanese tourist, and Ji-Hoon, a South Korean film student, meet in Hong Kong. Despite a rocky meeting and their language barrier, they become good friends. In time, they eventually head back to their respective countries but only after exchanging email addresses – promising to keep in touch and eventually meet again. But with fate pushing them to see each other again, Tomoko decides to go to South Korea to meet Ji-hoon again but some problems occur.

Cast

Korean
Kim Ji Hoon – Won Bin
Park Kyoung-joo – Lee Dong-gun
Park Hye-jin - Han Hye-jin
Gyu-han - Dokgo Young-jae 
Soo-kyung - Sunwoo Eun-sook

Japanese
Tomoko Asai – Kyoko Fukada
Yuko Yamagishi – Akiko Yada
Midori Kaneda – Naho Toda
Shota Sakamaki – Yukiyoshi Ozawa
Satoko Asai – Keiko Takeshita

International Broadcast

External links
Official site
 

2002 South Korean television series debuts
2002 South Korean television series endings
MBC TV television dramas
Japanese drama television series
2002 Japanese television series debuts
2002 Japanese television series endings
Television shows set in Hong Kong
Television shows written by Yoshikazu Okada
South Korean romance television series
Zainichi Korean culture